Canaan Township, Ohio, may refer to:

Canaan Township, Athens County, Ohio
Canaan Township, Madison County, Ohio
Canaan Township, Morrow County, Ohio
Canaan Township, Wayne County, Ohio

Ohio township disambiguation pages